The Train: Some Lines Should Never Be Crossed... is a 2007 Indian Hindi-language crime thriller film directed by Hasnain Hyderabadwala and Raksha Mistry. The film stars Emraan Hashmi, Geeta Basra and debutant Sayali Bhagat in the lead roles, and tells the story of a married couple caught up in a complex emotional tangle revolving around an extramarital affair. It is a remake of the 2005 American film Derailed. It was a box office disappointment.

Plot

Vishal Dixit (Emraan Hashmi), is a regular middle class man, settled in Bangkok with his wife, Anjali Dixit (Sayali Bhagat) and their 5-year-old daughter, Nikki, who is suffering from kidney failure and is in need of an operation. Anjali and Vishal are trying to hold on to their deteriorating marriage which is already under tremendous pressure due to their daughter’s illness. 

One ordinary day, on his way to work, Vishal meets Roma Kapoor (Geeta Basra), a beautiful, captivating woman. The attraction between them is instantaneous. Vishal gets to know her better and the two show each other photographs of their respective daughters and begin to talk. A mutual attraction develops. Vishal realizes that she too is a loner, trapped in a loveless marriage and the two begin meeting frequently. Ultimately, they decide to consummate their affair and end up in a hotel.

However, an armed man named Tony (Aseem Merchant) bursts into the hotel room, and robs them. Despite Vishal's pleads to both be left, Tony instead inspects both their wallets and find out that they are having an affair. Tony takes advantage and tries to make a move on Roma. Vishal tried to stop Tony, but Tony beats Vishal unconscious, and rapes Roma. Vishal and Roma agree not to report the crime, as they do not want their spouses to learn of the affair. Shortly after, Vishal is blackmailed by Tony, who threatens to reveal the truth to his family if he does not pay him, which Vishal promptly does. A month later, Tony calls again, this time demanding 1 lakh. Vishal refuses him outright however Tony is then shown to have entered Vishal house by befriending Vishal’s wife and daughter and out of earshot repeats his demand or he will expose the truth to them.

Vishal and Roma go back to the hotel and remove the paperwork from the desk as evidence that they had an affair. However Tony finds out and threatens to expose pictures of them to the entire public if he is not paid 5 lakh. Vishal explains his situation to Charlie (Suresh Menon), an ex-con who works as a cameraman in his advertising team and a close family friend whom Vishal had earlier befriended. Charlie offers to scare off Tony for a percent of the payout and Vishal agrees. He and Charlie travel to the meeting location specified by Tony, intending to catch him by surprise. However, before they can act, Charlie is shot and killed. Tony appears and takes the money, leaving Vishal to dispose of the body. Afterwards, Vishal is questioned by officer Asif Ahmed Khan (Rajat Bedi) about Charlie’s murder. Later, Vishal receives a call from Tony who has Roma hostage and threatens to kill her and Vishal's family if he does not pay him on time. This time the ransom is increased as high as 10 lakh, which is all the money put aside for Nikki's medical treatment. Vishal gives all this off as Tony leaves him completely broke. Later on the family doctor phones to inform him they have found a donor match for Nikki and can do the operation, but a defeated Vishal rues that he can’t pay for his daughter operation.

The next day, Vishal confesses the truth to a devastated Anjali, stops by Roma's company to see her. However he is introduced to the real Roma Kapoor. The woman he met on the train is identified as Richa Malhotra, a temp who had worked there briefly. He goes to Roma's apartment, which he realizes is actually in the process of being rented out. Seeing that Roma's photograph of her daughter was actually a cut out of a stock picture in a brochure, Vishal realizes Roma was in on the scam. 

He tracks her down and sees her kissing Tony, who, it turns out, is her boyfriend. Determined to retrieve his stolen money, he follows Richa's moves and sees that she is seducing another unsuspecting businessman. He rents a room in the same hotel where Richa, Tony, and their partner set him up and awaits them as they prepare to attack their new target. Richa and the businessman go to the room, but Vishal knocks Tony unconscious before he can follow them. Vishal breaks in and demands the return of his money. 

A gunfight ensues, and everyone is shot but Vishal, and a dying Richa reveals his money is in the hotel safe and then dies. Vishal, while in his rented room, is cleared by the police near the crime scene. As he leaves the hotel lobby, the continued investigation has all contents from the hotel safe laid out on the front desk. Vishal politely approaches the police and identifies his briefcase, which still contains his money, and quietly leaves the hotel. Vishal returns to his family, Nikki operation is successful and Anjali reconciles with him.

Cast
Emraan Hashmi as Vishal Dixit
Sayali Bhagat as Anjali Dixit, Vishal's wife
Rajat Bedi as officer Asif Ahmed Khan(Special Appearance)
Geeta Basra as Roma Ram Kapoor alias Richa Malhotra, Vishal and Tony's love interest 	
Aseem Merchant as Tony
Rajesh Khattar as Roma's friend
Aditi Bhatia as Nikita "Nikki" Dixit, Vishal's daughter
 Suresh Menon as Charlie

Soundtrack

The music of the film was composed by Mithoon with lyrics penned by Sayeed Quadri. The songs Woh Ajnabee, Beete Lamhe & Mausam were chartbusters

Reception
Taran Adarsh from Bollywood Hungama gave the film a 3-star rating out of 5, calling it a novel experience for those who have not seen Derailed.

References

External links

2007 films
2000s Hindi-language films
Indian remakes of American films
Rail transport films
Films about adultery in India
Indian crime thriller films
Indian thriller drama films
Indian crime drama films